The Chandler Building (sometimes called the Chandler Apartments) is a historic building at the corner of Dwight Way and Telegraph Avenue in Berkeley, California. It is 4 stories tall. It was built in the 1920s.

The building is the featured setting of a 2002 mystery novel The Chandler Apartments by Owen Hill, who wrote the book while living there.  The building is currently unoccupied as a result of a fire on 22 November 2015.

It is the former residence of novelist Jonathan Lethem.

References
The Chandler Apartments, Owen Hill. Creative Arts Book Company (2002) 

Buildings and structures in Berkeley, California
Apartment buildings in California
1920s establishments in California
Residential buildings completed in the 20th century